The 1949 Tennessee Volunteers represented the University of Tennessee in the 1949 college football season. Playing as a member of the Southeastern Conference (SEC), the team was led by head coach Robert Neyland, in his 18th year, and played their home games at Shields–Watkins Field in Knoxville, Tennessee. They finished the season with a record of seven wins, two losses, and one tie (7–2–1 overall, 4–1–1 in the SEC).

Schedule

Team players drafted into the NFL

References

Tennessee
Tennessee Volunteers football seasons
Tennessee Volunteers football